The 1950 All-SEC football team consists of American football players selected to the All-Southeastern Conference (SEC) chosen by various selectors for the 1950 college football season. Kentucky won the conference.

All-SEC selections

Ends
Bucky Curtis, Vanderbilt (AP-1, UP-1)
Bud Sherrod, Tennessee (AP-1, UP-2)
Al Lary, Alabama (UP-1)
John Weigel, Georgia Tech (AP-3, UP-2)
Bob Walston, Georgia (AP-2)
Al Bruno, Kentucky (AP-2)
Majure Stribling, Ole Miss (AP-3)
Art Tait, Miss. St. (AP-3)

Tackles
Bob Gain, Kentucky (College Football Hall of Fame)  (AP-1, UP-1) 
Paul Lea, Tulane (AP-1, UP-1)
Pug Pearman, Tennessee (AP-2, UP-1)
Russ Faulkinberry, Vanderbilt (AP-2)
Bob Werckle, Vanderbilt (UP-2)
Marion Campbell, Georgia (AP-3)
Charlie LaPradd, Florida (AP-3)

Guards
Mike Mizerany, Alabama (AP-1, UP-1)
Ted Daffer, Tennessee (AP-1, UP-1)
Rocco Principe, Georgia (AP-2, UP-2)
Bill Wannamaker, Kentucky (AP-2, UP-2)
Banks, Auburn (AP-3)
Pat James, Kentucky (AP-3)

Centers
Pat O'Sullivan, Alabama (AP-1, UP-2)
Bob Bossons, Georgia Tech (UP-1, AP-3)
Doug Moseley, Kentucky (AP-2)

Quarterbacks
Babe Parilli, Kentucky (AP-1, UP-1)
Bill Wade, Vanderbilt (AP-2, UP-2)
Butch Avinger, Alabama (AP-3)

Halfbacks 
 Ed Salem, Alabama (AP-1, UP-1)
 Hank Lauricella, Tennessee (College Football Hall of Fame)  (AP-2, UP-1)
 Kenny Konz, LSU (AP-1, UP-2)
 Haywood Sullivan, Florida (AP-2, UP-2)
 Billy Mixon, Georgia (AP-3)
 Wilbur Jamerson, Kentucky (AP-3)
 Bob North, Georgia Tech (AP-3)

Fullbacks
John Dotley, Ole Miss (AP-1, UP-1)
Bill Leskovar, Kentucky (AP-2, UP-2)

Key

AP = Associated Press

UP = United Press

Bold = Consensus first-team selection by both AP and UP

See also
1950 College Football All-America Team

References

All-SEC
All-SEC football teams